The 606 Club (also known as "The Six") is a jazz club in Chelsea, London. The club is in a basement venue at 90 Lots Road in London SW10 (opposite Lots Road Power Station) and is currently licensed for 175 people. It offers jazz, Latin, soul, R&B, blues and gospel music seven nights a week, and sometimes also on Sunday afternoons, making it one of the busiest jazz clubs in Europe.

The club has been owned and run by musician Steve Rubie since 1976. According to Rubie, the club's history goes back much further and it was active in the 1960s.

The club was originally a small 30-seater venue at 606 King's Road, but moved to its current site in May 1988.

See also
List of jazz clubs

References

External links
Official homepage
606 Club Review

Chelsea, London
Clubs and societies in London
Jazz clubs in London